Seth Quintero (born September 12, 2002) is American off-road racing driver. He is currently part of Red Bull's rallying team for rally raid events and competes in the World Rally-Raid Championship. 

He holds the record for the most number of stage wins in a single Dakar, with 12 stage victories in the 2022 Dakar.

Career 
Quintero grew up in San Marcos, California, where by age four he was already riding ATVs. Quintero began competing in SSV racing at age 10, and at age 11 won the Junior UTV World Championship. In 2015, Quintero won the Junior UTV World Championship again as well as winning the World Off Road Championship Series. 

In 2018, Quintero moved up to the professional ranks with backing from energy drink company Red Bull. Quintero finished second at the Mint 400 and the Vegas to Reno events during his debut season. In 2019, Quintero won the Best in the Desert championship in the UTV Pro category, winning six events including the Mint 400.

In 2020, Quintero began competing internationally, and one year later, in 2021, began competing at the top level of SSV racing, including making his debut at the Dakar Rally and making two appearances in the 2021 FIA World Cup for Cross-Country Rallies. In the 2021 Dakar Rally, Quintero won six stages, in the process setting a new record for youngest stage winner in Dakar history. At the 2022 Dakar Rally, Quintero set a new record for most stage wins in a single running of the event, claiming 12 stage victories out of 13 total. However, in the only stage he failed to win, Quintero lost over 17 hours due to mechanical failures, resulting in a distant 16th place finish in the overall rankings. Besides the Dakar, Quintero also contested the full season of the inaugural World Rally-Raid Championship, where he finished second in points with an event win at the Rallye du Maroc.

At the 2023 Dakar Rally, Quintero secured his first podium in the event with a second place finish overall and two stage victories, finishing only behind his teammate Austin Jones.

Rally results

Dakar Rally results

Complete World Rally-Raid Championship results 
(key)

* Season still in progress

References 

Living people
2002 births
American rally drivers
Dakar Rally drivers
Off-road racing drivers
Racing drivers from California
People from San Marcos, California
Sportspeople from San Diego County, California